Chacha Chaudhary is an Indian animated television series produced by Toonz Animation India, Trivandrum . It premiered on 10 June 2019 on Disney Channel India and Hungama TV.

References

Indian children's animated action television series
Indian children's animated comedy television series
Television shows based on comics
2019 Indian television series debuts